USS Milledgeville has been the name of more than one United States Navy ship, and may refer to:

 , a patrol frigate in commission from 1945 to 1946
 , a patrol frigate cancelled in 1943
 , a patrol craft in commission from 1943 to 1956 as USS PC-1263 and as USS Milledgeville from 1956 to 1959

United States Navy ship names